Nikesh Patel (born 1985) is a British actor, best known for his role as Aafrin Dalal in the TV series Indian Summers, Kash Khan in the mini series Four Weddings and A Funeral, and Tom Kapoor in the sitcom Starstruck.

Early life
Patel was born in Wembley, London. His parents are pharmacists. He completed his secondary education at the City of London School. He initially wanted to become a journalist but turned to acting while at university.

Career
Patel started acting during his time reading English at the University of Warwick, where he played Othello in a student production. After graduating with a BA in English Literature, Patel went on to train at the Guildhall School of Music and Drama. He graduated from Guildhall in 2010 and was awarded the school's gold medal for Acting that year.

Theatre
Patel got his professional start in the theatre, appearing in Anupama Chandrasekhar's play Disconnect at the Royal Court Theatre in 2010. In 2011, Patel was part of the ensemble of the Royal Shakespeare Company's 50th birthday season and appeared in The Taming of the Shrew (Petruchio), Macbeth (Donalbain) and The Merchant of Venice (Balthasar). He had a role in Rona Munro's play Donny's Brain at the Hampstead Theatre in 2012 and returned to the Royal Court Theatre in 2013 to appear in Abhishek Majumdar's play The Djinns of Eidgah. Also in 2013, Patel had a role in Howard Brenton's play Drawing the Line at the Hampstead Theatre. He appeared in Man, a production of three one-act plays by Tennessee Williams, at the Young Vic in 2015.

Television, film and radio
Patel's first television credit was playing the character Dan in the second series of the Sky Living series Bedlam. This was followed by roles in single episodes of Midsomer Murders and Law and Order: UK. In 2015, he played Tanvir in the film Honour. He then had a leading role in the TV series Indian Summers, which ran for two seasons. In 2016, he played Raghdan Aziz in the film Halal Daddy and Pradhan in London Has Fallen. He played the lead role in BBC Radio 4's 2017 adaptation of Salman Rushdie's novel Midnight's Children. In 2019 he played Arcite, one of the two title characters in the BBC Radio 3 production of William Shakespeare's Two Noble Kinsmen.

2019 saw Patel take on roles in two high-profile television shows: He played Mitch in the Doctor Who New Year's Day special episode, Resolution as well as Kash Khan, one of the seven lead characters in Mindy Kaling's 2019 miniseries adaptation of Four Weddings and a Funeral.

Patel appeared in the 2020 fantasy film Artemis Fowl, playing tech expert centaur Foaly. The final stage of the audition process was a screen-test in which he had to perform on stilts to realistically emulate being half man, half horse.

Filmography

References

External links

1985 births
Living people
21st-century English male actors
English male film actors
English male television actors
English male stage actors
British male actors of Indian descent